Tapio Korjus (born 10 February 1961, in Vehkalahti) is a Finnish former javelin thrower.

Born in Vehkalahti, he was one of the leading representatives of javelin throwing in his home country in the 1980s, but did not attain international success until 1988.

At the Summer Olympics held in Seoul, South Korea, Korjus held the silver medal position for most of the contest. However, with the last throw of the competition, he threw for 84.28 meters, which meant gold for Korjus. The silver medal was eventually won by a young Jan Železný, who went on to be one of the dominant javelin throwers of all time.

After that stunning triumph Korjus quickly disappeared from the scene, having no more success.

After his active career he has coached other javelin throwers like Mikaela Ingberg.

References

1961 births
Living people
People from Hamina
Finnish male javelin throwers
Athletes (track and field) at the 1988 Summer Olympics
Olympic athletes of Finland
Finnish athletics coaches
Medalists at the 1988 Summer Olympics
Olympic gold medalists for Finland
Olympic gold medalists in athletics (track and field)
Sportspeople from Kymenlaakso